Vigorous and Liberating Death is the twelfth full-length studio album from Finnish black metal band Impaled Nazarene.  It was released, as are all of their albums thus far, on Osmose Productions on April 14, 2014. The album is available on CD, gatefold LP and digital download.

In an interview on Finnish radio channel Yle X3M, the band stated that the first demos for the album were done on late 2012 but the actual recording was delayed due to issues with their then-upcoming live DVD and its promotion tour. In the same interview, Luttinen told that the album's title and lyrical themes handle death from various viewpoints: the death of Finland's and European Union's economies, the death of freedom of speech among others.

Track listing
All songs written by Impaled Nazarene.

"King Reborn" 2:39
"Flaming Sword of Satan" 3:16
"Pathological Hunger for Violence" 2:33
"Vestal Virgins" 2:44
"Martial Law" 2:24
"Riskiarvio" 3:25
"Apocalypse Principle" 2:39
"Kuoleman Varjot" 1:37
"Vigorous and Liberating Death" 2:38
"Drink Consultation" 2:21
"Dystopia A. S." 2:31
"Sananvapaus" 0:44
"Hostis Humani Generis" 4:17

Personnel
Mika "Sluti666" Luttinen – vocals
Tomi "UG" Ullgren – lead and rhythm guitars
Mikael "Arc v 666" Arnkil – bass
Reima "Repe Misanthrope" Kellokoski – drums

Production
Arranged and produced by Impaled Nazarene
Recorded by Tero "Max" Kostermaa at City Lights Studio, December 2013 - February 2014
Mixed by Tero "Max" Kostermaa at Studio Fungus, February 2014
Mastered by Mika Jussila at Finnvox Studios, February 2014

Miscellaneous staff
Artwork by Taneli Jarva

Charts

References

Impaled Nazarene albums
Osmose Productions albums
2014 albums